Claude Debussy's Études (L 136) are a set of 12 piano études composed in 1915. Debussy described them as "a warning to pianists not to take up the musical profession unless they have remarkable hands". They are broadly considered his late masterpieces.

 Étude 1 pour les cinq doigts d'après Monsieur Czerny (five fingers, "after Monsieur Czerny")
 Étude 2 pour les tierces (thirds)
 Étude 3 pour les quartes (fourths)
 Étude 4 pour les sixtes (sixths)
 Étude 5 pour les octaves
 Étude 6 pour les huit doigts (eight fingers)
 Étude 7 pour les degrés chromatiques (chromatic degrees)
 Étude 8 pour les agréments (ornaments)
 Étude 9 pour les notes répétées (repeated notes)
 Étude 10 pour les sonorités opposées (opposing sonorities)
 Étude 11 pour les arpèges composés (composite arpeggios)
 Étude 12 pour les accords (chords)

Notes

References 
 Elie Robert Schmitz, V. Thomson. The Piano Works of Claude Debussy. Courier Dover Publications, 1966.

External links 

Compositions by Claude Debussy
Debussy
1915 compositions